Maximiliano Brian Rolón (19 January 1995 – 14 May 2022) was an Argentine professional footballer who  played as a left winger.

He spent several years at Barcelona, where he played 24 games for the B-team before a move to Santos in Brazil in 2016. With the Argentina under-20 team, he won the South American Youth Football Championship in 2015. He subsequently had brief spells in Argentina, Ecuador, Chile and Iraq before his death in a car crash at the age of 27.

Club career

Barcelona
Born in Rosario, Rolón started his youth career with local club Atlético Luján. In 2007, he joined FC Barcelona's youth setup, but only moved to La Masia three years later. In 2013, he was loaned to UE Cornellà due to his non-EU status, and returned to Barça the following January, being assigned to the Juvenil A squad.

In May 2014 Rolón was promoted to the reserves in Segunda División. After being strongly linked to a possible loan move to Lleida Esportiu in August, he remained at the club and made his debut as a professional on 4 October, replacing Juan Cámara in the 74th minute of a 0–1 home loss against CD Lugo.

On 20 September 2015, with the team now in Segunda División B, Rolón scored his first senior goal, the game's only away to UE Olot for a first victory of the season. On 1 February of the following year, he rescinded his contract.

Santos
On 16 February 2016, Rolón agreed to a one-year deal with Brazilian club Santos FC. He only signed his contract on 4 March, due to bureaucratic problems.

Rolón made his debut for the club on 21 April 2016, coming on as a late substitute for Rafael Longuine in a 1–1 away draw against Santos-AP. On 6 July, after receiving very little playing time, he rescinded his contract.

Later career
On 31 January 2017, Rolón returned to Spain and its second level, after signing a six-month deal with Lugo. After only two games played, he left the club again at the end of his contract in June 2017.

Rolón arrived in the Argentine Primera División for the first time in August 2017, signing for Arsenal de Sarandí. The following February, he signed for Coquimbo Unido in Primera B de Chile.

Released by his Chilean club in August 2018, Rolón returned to Spain and joined  CE Pubilla Casas of the Segona Catalana in November. He played two games for the club, scoring three goals, one of them a penalty.

In January 2019, Rolón went back to South America, joining Fuerza Amarilla S.C. in the Ecuadorian Serie A. His nine games for the team from Machala included being sent off on 13 July in a 4–1 home loss to C.S. Emelec. In August 2020, the 25-year-old moved to Al-Diwaniya SC in the Iraqi Premier League.

At the time of his death in 2022, Rolón was playing amateur football in Casilda, Santa Fe Province.

International career
Rolón was called up for the Argentina under-20 team in August 2014, for the year's L'Alcúdia International Football Tournament. He appeared regularly during the tournament, also playing against Barcelona in one of the matches.

Rolón was part of the team that won the 2015 South American U-20 Championship in Uruguay. He scored the opening goal of a 2–0 win over Brazil on 1 February.

Personal life and death
Rolón's twin brother, Leonardo, is also a footballer. A right back or right winger, he was a teammate at Arsenal de Sarandí.

Rolón and his 30-year-old brother, Ariel, died when their car collided with a tree in Casilda on the morning of 14 May 2022.

Career statistics

Source:

Honours
Barcelona
 UEFA Youth League: 2013–14

Santos
 Campeonato Paulista: 2016

Argentina U20
 South American Youth Football Championship: 2015

References

External links
 
 

1995 births
2022 deaths
Argentine twins
Twin sportspeople
Footballers from Rosario, Santa Fe
Argentine footballers
Argentine expatriate footballers
Association football wingers
Segunda División players
Segunda División B players
Campeonato Brasileiro Série A players
Argentine Primera División players
Primera B de Chile players
Ecuadorian Serie A players
FC Barcelona Atlètic players
CD Lugo players
Arsenal de Sarandí footballers
Coquimbo Unido footballers
Fuerza Amarilla S.C. footballers
Santos FC players
Al-Diwaniya FC players
2015 South American Youth Football Championship players
Argentina youth international footballers
Argentina under-20 international footballers
Argentine expatriate sportspeople in Spain
Argentine expatriate sportspeople in Brazil
Argentine expatriate sportspeople in Chile
Argentine expatriate sportspeople in Ecuador
Expatriate footballers in Ecuador
Expatriate footballers in Chile
Expatriate footballers in Spain
Expatriate footballers in Brazil
Expatriate footballers in Iraq
Road incident deaths in Argentina